MiTAC Holdings Corporation, through a stock swap from MiTAC International Corp., was established on 12 September 2013. In the meantime, MiTAC Group was also implementing restructuring to meet the future operational direction of the group. And after, the Group separated the original MiTAC cloud computing business group to establish an independent MiTAC Computing Technology Corporation (神雲科技) on 1 September 2014.

MiTAC Computing Technology Corporation's core is cloud database and computing equipment. With more than twenty years of ODM industry experience and TYAN brand, MiTAC designs and manufactures servers based on Intel x86, SPARC, IBM Power ISA, and ARM processors.

In January 2015, Avnet Embedded, a division of Avnet Electronics Marketing Americas, has signed a new distribution agreement with MiTAC Computing Technology Corp., a designer and manufacturer of cloud database and computing equipment.

History 
 2014: MiTAC International Corp span off the Cloud Computing Business Group to MiTAC Computing Technology Corp. (MCT). The latter was formally operated on September 1.
Won 2013 Supplier Award from Fujitsu.

 2015: TYAN announced the first server- TN71-BP012, with IBM POWER 8 Architecture and followed the OpenPOWER Foundation's design concept.

Products  
Rack Mount Server, Tower Server / HPC, Storage system, Blade Server, GPU Computing, Cloud Computing server 
Panel PC, All-in-one PC, Embedded Board, Embedded Box PC, OCP Solutions

References

Companies based in Hsinchu
Navigation system companies
Video surveillance companies
Electronics companies of Taiwan
Taiwanese brands
Taiwanese companies established in 2014